Radiobacillus  is a Gram-positive, UV-resistant, rod-shaped, aerobic, endospore-forming and non-motile genus of bacteria from the family of Bacillaceae with one known species (Radiobacillus deserti). Radiobacillus deserti has been isolated from sandy soil from the Taklimakan Desert.

References

Bacillaceae
Bacteria genera
Monotypic bacteria genera
Taxa described in 2020